The Monticello Community School District is a rural public school district headquartered in Monticello, Iowa.  The district is mostly in Jones County, with smaller portions in Delaware County and Linn County.  The district serves the city of Monticello, and the surrounding rural areas. Brian Jaeger was hired as superintendent in 2016.

List of schools
The Monticello Community School District operates four schools, all in Monticello:
 Monticello High School
 Monticello Middle School
 Carpenter Elementary School
 Shannon Elementary School

Monticello High School

Athletics
The Panthers compete in the River Valley Conference in the following sports:

Baseball
Bowling
Basketball (boys and girls)
Cross Country (boys and girls)
 Boys' - 3-time Class 2A State Champions (2007, 2011, 2012)
Football
Golf (boys and girls)
Soccer (boys and girls)
Softball
Track and Field (boys and girls)
 Boys' - 3-time Class 2A State Champions (1998, 2007, 2013)
Volleyball
Wrestling

See also
List of school districts in Iowa
List of high schools in Iowa

References

External links
 Monticello Community School District

School districts in Iowa
Education in Delaware County, Iowa
Education in Jones County, Iowa
Education in Linn County, Iowa